Mucronella is a genus of fungi in the family Clavariaceae. Species in the genus resemble awl-shaped teeth that grow in groups without a common subiculum (supporting layer of mycelium).

Taxonomy
The type species was originally named Hydnum calvum in a collaborative effort by the German botanist Johannes Baptista von Albertini and the American Lewis David de Schweinitz in 1805. Swedish mycologist Elias Magnus Fries transferred the species to the newly described genus Mucronella in 1874.

Molecular phylogenetic analysis suggests that the genus is monophyletic, and is sister to the remainder of the Clavariaceae, confirming earlier suspicions that the taxa were phylogenetically related. It had previously been placed in the Russulales due to its amyloid spores, and its morphological similarity to some members of genus Hericium.

Description
Fruitbodies of Mucronella species resemble hanging spines; they occur singly, scattered, or in groups. Colors range from white to yellow to orange. Mucronella has a monomitic hyphal system —consisting of only generative hyphae. The basidia (spore-bearing cells) are four-spored and club shaped. Basidiospores are usually smooth with thin walls, weakly amyloid, and somewhat hyaline (translucent). Mucronella is the sole genus in the Clavariaceae with amyloid spores, and with the "hanging spine" fruitbody morphology.

Habitat and distribution
Mucronella species are saprotrophic. Kartar Singh Thind and I.P.S. Khurana identified five species from the northwestern Himalayas, India, in 1974: M. bresadolae, M. calva, M. flava, M. subalpina, and M. pulchra.

Species

, Index Fungorum accepts 17 species of Mucronella:
Mucronella albidula (Corner) Berthier 1985
Mucronella argentina Speg. 1898 – South America
Mucronella belalongensis P.Roberts 1998 – Brunei
Mucronella brasiliensis Corner 1950 – South America
Mucronella bresadolae (Quél.) Corner 1970
Mucronella calva (Alb. & Schwein.) Fr. 1874
Mucronella flava Corner 1953
Mucronella fusiformis (Kauffman) K.A.Harrison 1972
Mucronella minutissima Peck 1891
Mucronella pendula (Massee) R.H.Petersen 1980 – Australia
Mucronella polyporacea Velen. 1922 – Europe
Mucronella pulchra Corner 1970 – Pakistan
Mucronella pusilla Corner 1950
Mucronella ramosa Lloyd 1922
Mucronella styriaca Maas Geest. 1977 – Europe
Mucronella subalpina K.S.Thind & Khurana 1974 – India
Mucronella togoensis Henn. 1897 – Africa

See also
List of Agaricales genera

References

External links

Clavariaceae
Agaricales genera
Taxa named by Elias Magnus Fries
Taxa described in 1874